Payagolycus is a monospecific genus of marine ray-finned fish belonging to the family Zoarcidae, the eelpouts. Its only species is Patagolycus melastomus which is found in the southwestern Atlantic Ocean.

References

Lycodinae
Fish described in 2012
Monotypic ray-finned fish genera